Martin Alonzo Haynes (July 30, 1842 – November 28, 1919) was an American politician and a United States Representative from New Hampshire.

Early life
Born in Springfield, Sullivan County, New Hampshire, Haynes moved with his parents to Manchester, Hillsborough County, New Hampshire in 1846. He attended the common schools and apprenticed to the printer's trade. At the outbreak of the Civil War, he enlisted in June 1861 in the Union Army as a private in the Second New Hampshire Regiment and served three years.

Career
Haynes moved to Lakeport, Belknap County, New Hampshire in 1868, where he established the Lake Village Times, published every Saturday. He was publisher and editor for twenty years.

Haynes served as member of the New Hampshire House of Representatives in 1872 and 1873. He served as clerk of the supreme court for Belknap County, 1876-1883. He was president of the New Hampshire Veterans' Association in 1881 and 1882, and was department commander of the Grand Army of the Republic in 1881 and 1882.

Elected as a Republican to the Forty-eighth and Forty-ninth Congresses, Haynes served as United States Representative for the state of New Hampshire from (March 4, 1883 – March 3, 1887). He was an unsuccessful candidate for reelection in 1886 to the Fiftieth Congress.

Haynes was an internal-revenue agent of the Treasury, from 1890 to 1893 and from 1898 to 1912. He established the internal-revenue service in the Philippine Islands.

Death
Haynes died in Lakeport, New Hampshire, on November 28, 1919, (age 77 years, 121 days). He is interred at Bayside Cemetery, Lakeport, New Hampshire.

Family life
Son of Elbridge Gerry and Caroline R Knowlton Haynes, he married Cornelia T. Lane on March 9, 1863 in Springfield, New Hampshire and they had two children, Ruth Ida Haynes and Mary Addie Haynes.

References

External links

 Works by Martin Alonzo Haynes at Project Gutenberg
 

1842 births
1919 deaths
People from Springfield, New Hampshire
Union Army soldiers
Republican Party members of the United States House of Representatives from New Hampshire
19th-century American politicians
Grand Army of the Republic officials